Dorothy Stickney (June 21, 1896 – June 2, 1998) was an American film, stage, and television actress, best known for appearing in the long running Broadway hit Life with Father.

Early years
Stickney was born in Dickinson, North Dakota, but because of a medical condition, she was unable to go into bright places and spent most of her childhood indoors to protect her sensitive eyes. Her introduction to reading came from family members who read the classics to her. Because she had difficulty reading, she focused on skills like dancing and elocution. She was fond of going to the theater with her family, and this sparked her interest in being an actress. Because of several eye surgeries, by her teens, Stickney was able to continue her education and pursue a career in the theater.

Stickney attended the North Western Dramatic School in Minneapolis, Minnesota.

Career 
Stickney sang and danced as one of the four Southern Belles in vaudeville and began acting in summer stock companies including Atlanta's Forsyth Players in the early 1920s before she married Howard Lindsay. In 1927, Stickney and Lindsay were married, and the two stayed married until Lindsay's death in 1968.

Stickney made her Broadway debut in 1926 in The Squall and had a string of hits, frequently playing eccentric characters. She was Liz, the mad scrubwoman, in the original nonmusical version of Chicago, and Mollie Molloy, who dives out of the pressroom window, in The Front Page. With increasingly important roles, she moved on to Philip Goes Forth, Another Language, On Borrowed Time, The Small Hours, To Be Continued and The Honeys. In 1940, Stickney received the Barter Theatre Award for "outstanding performance for an American player" for her role as Vinnie in Life with Father, which had been written by her husband, Lindsay, who also co-starred. The award was presented to her by Eleanor Roosevelt.

She also appeared in some films and TV programs, and wrote several poems including "You're Not the Type" and "My Dressing Room". She played the Queen in the original 1957 TV production of Rodgers & Hammerstein's Cinderella, and later Aunt Abby in the 1962 Hallmark TV production of Arsenic and Old Lace, co-starring Boris Karloff.

In 1961, she was the second inductee of the North Dakota Roughrider Award. On November 16, 1966, Stickney appeared on ABC's Stage 67 anthology program in Stephen Sondheim's macabre television musical Evening Primrose as Mrs. Monday, the leader of the mannequins who come to life every evening in a department store. One of her later stage roles was as Berthe in the original Broadway run of Pippin from 1972 to 1977. She took over the role in 1973 from Irene Ryan, who died during the run. She created the role of Emily Baldwin, one of the Baldwin sisters, in the television film The Homecoming : A Christmas Story, which was the pilot for The Waltons.

In 1979, Stickney published Openings and Closings, a memoir that chronicled her long career as well as her secret battle with stage fright.

Stickney and Howard maintained a longtime home in Stanton, New Jersey.

Death
She died on June 2, 1998, in New York City. She had no children and no immediate family survivors.

Filmography

References

External links
 
 
 
 Dorothy Stickney and Howard Lindsay papers and scrapbooks, 1931-1985, held by the Billy Rose Theatre Division, New York Public Library for the Performing Arts
 Dorothy Stickney and Howard Lindsay papers, additions, 1909-1985, held by the Billy Rose Theatre Division, New York Public Library for the Performing Arts

1896 births
1998 deaths
20th-century American actresses
Actresses from North Dakota
American centenarians
American film actresses
American stage actresses
American television actresses
People from Dickinson, North Dakota
People from Readington Township, New Jersey
Vaudeville performers
Women centenarians